Fraschini is an Italian surname. Notable people with the surname include:

 Achille Fraschini (born 1936), Italian football midfielder
 Gaetano Fraschini (1816–1887), Italian tenor
 Mario Fraschini (1938–1983), Italian sprinter

Italian-language surnames